CFKL-TV was a television station based in Schefferville, Quebec, Canada. Formerly a private affiliate of CBC Television and Télévision de Radio-Canada, the station was acquired by the Canadian Broadcasting Corporation in 1973 and converted to a rebroadcaster of Montreal's CBMT.

The station was owned by the Iron Ore Company of Canada's Aviation subsidiary, and was co-owned with nearby station CJCL-TV in Labrador City.

History
CFKL aired a schedule consisting of 73 per cent English programming and 27 per cent French programming. Although privately owned, all shows aired were from CBC and Radio-Canada, with none of its shows being local.

On July 28, 1970, the licences for the two stations were renewed for only two years. The Iron Ore Company of Canada Aviation, Limited was considered ineligible to hold a broadcast television station license, as 60 per cent of the company's shares were owned by American companies. Since it was considered very unlikely another company would be willing to buy these stations, their licenses were renewed temporarily under the existing ownership.

The Canadian Broadcasting Corporation was given approval to purchase CJCL-TV and CFKL-TV on March 30, 1973. CJCL changed its call letters to CBNLT and continued to operate as a separate station until 1991, when it became a satellite of CBNT in St. John's, while CFKL became CBSET-1, a repeater of Sept-Îles' CBSET, which, in turn, was a semi-satellite of Montreal's CBMT. As of July 31, 2012, both CBNLT and CBSET-1 have shut down due to austerity measures implemented at the CBC.

External links
 

FKL
FKL
FKL
1991 disestablishments in Quebec
Television channels and stations disestablished in 1991
FKL